Shaid Wadvalla (born 25 July 1949) is a former South African cricketer and umpire. He stood in three ODI games between 2001 and 2002. In January 2020, he was named as one of the three match referees for the 2020 Under-19 Cricket World Cup tournament in South Africa.

See also
 List of One Day International cricket umpires

References

1949 births
Living people
South African One Day International cricket umpires